Popenaias is a genus of freshwater mussels, aquatic bivalve molluscs in the family Unionidae, the river mussels.

Species
Species within the genus Popenaias include:
 Popenaias buckleyi
 Popenaias metallica
 Popenaias popeii
 Popenaias tehuantepecensis

References

 
Bivalve genera
Taxonomy articles created by Polbot